Felix Holbrook was a Black activist living in Boston and Rhode Island during the mid- to late-eighteenth century. A slave for many years, he was a staunch advocate of abolitionism. He placed an ad in a Boston newspaper asking for his freedom, and those who would aid him would be taking an honorable position against those trying to enslave them. Holbrook said that he understood colonialist's desire for political and religious freedom. He requested a position where he could earn the money to buy his freedom and return to Africa. His intention was to obtain his freedom through peaceful, lawful means. He wrote: “We ask you for relief, which as a man, we have a right to do”.

Notes

Year of birth missing
Year of death missing
African-American people